The genus Allonautilus contains two species of nautiluses, which have a significantly different morphology from those placed in the sister taxon Nautilus. Allonautilus is now thought to be a descendant of Nautilus, rendering the latter genus paraphyletic.

Live individuals of the genus have only been collected in Papua New Guinea and the Solomon Islands. Little is known about their biology because they live in deep waters, whereas the better-understood genus Nautilus lives closer to the surface.

The entire family Nautilidae, including all species in the genus Nautilus and  Allonautilus,  was listed on Appendix II of the Convention on International Trade in Endangered Species of Wild Fauna and Flora (CITES).

Species

References

External links
Allonautilus. CephBase.

Nautiluses
Nautiloid genera